Give Me Love may refer to:

 "Give Me Love (Give Me Peace on Earth)", a 1973 song by George Harrison
 "Give Me Love" (Ed Sheeran song), 2012
 "Give Me Love" (2PM song), 2013
 "Give Me Love" (Hey! Say! JUMP song), 2016
 "Give Me Love", a 1978 song by Cerrone from Supernature (Cerrone III)
 "Give Me Love", a 2015 song by Ciara from Jackie
 "Give Me Love", a 2017 song by Dimash Kudaibergen
 "Give Me Love", a 2018 song by Don Diablo from Future

See also
 "Give Me the Love", a 2016 song by AOA
 Gimme Love (disambiguation)